Schierokauer, Schirokauer is surname of:

 Alfred Schirokauer (1880 in Breslau – 1934 in Vienna), German writer
 Auguste Pünkösdy, aka Auguste Schirokauer-Pünkösdy (1890, Vienna – 1967), Austrian actress
 Arno Schirokauer, fully Arnold Fritz Kurt Schirokauer (1899, Cottbus – 1954), Jewish German writer and Germanist
 Conrad Schirokauer, American historian
 Robert Schirokauer Hartman (1910, Berlin - 1973), German-American logician and philosopher

German-language surnames
Jewish surnames
Surnames of Polish origin
Surnames of Silesian origin
Yiddish-language surnames